Franklin Central High School (FCHS) is a public four-year high school in Indianapolis, Indiana, United States. It is the only high school in the Franklin Township Community School Corporation.

Demographics
The demographic breakdown of the 2,503 students enrolled in 2015-2016 was:
Male - 51.7%
Female - 48.3%
White - 79.9%
Black - 6.2%
Hispanic - 6.1%
Multiracial - 4.0%
Asian/Pacific islanders - 3.6%
Native American/Alaskan - 0.2%

34.9% of the students were eligible for free or reduced lunch.

Athletics
Franklin Central's school colors are royal blue and white and their athletic nickname is the Flashes.

Franklin Central is a member of the Indiana High School Athletic Association (IHSAA) and the Hoosier Crossroads Conference.

Franklin Central High School is home to 12 boys' sports including Baseball, Basketball, Bowling, Cross Country, Football, Golf, Soccer, Swimming and Diving, Tennis, Track and Field, and Wrestling. Franklin Central also features 11 girls' sports including Basketball, Bowling, Cross Country, Golf, Gymnastics, Soccer, Softball, Swimming and Diving, Tennis, Track and Field, and Volleyball.

Franklin Central's stadium, the Franklin Township Athletic Center, is a  multipurpose facility that is used for football and track and field. The stadium is six stories tall and has seating for 3,500 on the home side. The facility was built in 2004 at a one-time cost of $4.3 million.

Conference History 

State Championships

 Football (1980,1981,1982,1990)
 Boys Cross Country (1998)

Historical notes

Super Bowl performance
During the Super Bowl XLVI halftime show in Indianapolis, the Franklin Central drum line and three other local high schools performed with Madonna.

Notable alumni
Mike Aulby - Former member of the PBA and one of only four PBA bowlers to win both a Rookie of the Year and Player of the Year award
Roger Burkman - Current athletic director at Spalding University in Louisville, Kentucky. Former NBA player for the Chicago Bulls. Member of the Indiana Basketball Hall of Fame
Jon Elrod - Former member of the Indiana House of Representatives from Indiana's 97th House District
JaJuan Johnson - Darüşşafaka S.K. power forward in the Turkish Basketball Super League
Jake "Irish" O'Brien - professional mixed martial arts fighter, formerly with the UFC 
Sunungura Rusununguko - Former AFL defensive lineman for the Indiana Firebirds, Colorado Crush and New Orleans VooDoo
Donald Washington - Former NFL cornerback for the Kansas City Chiefs
Seth Maxwell - Founder Thirst Project
Mitch Gore - Member of the Indiana House of Representatives from Indiana's 89th House District
Marcus Burk - Professional basketball player

See also
 List of high schools in Indiana

References

External links

District website

Schools in Indianapolis
Public high schools in Indiana
Educational institutions established in 1960
1960 establishments in Indiana